Eric J. Regan was a 19th-century footballer who played for Ardwick and Burslem Port Vale.

Career
Regan played for Ardwick, before joining Burslem Port Vale in August 1894. He made his debut in a 4–1 defeat at old club Ardwick (who had by then changed their name to Manchester City) on 8 September 1894. He only managed a further four Second Division matches before his release from the Athletic Ground, which came at the end of the season.

Career statistics
Source:

References

Year of birth missing
Year of death missing
English footballers
Association football midfielders
Manchester City F.C. players
Port Vale F.C. players
English Football League players